Torodora epicharis is a moth in the family Lecithoceridae. It was described by Kyu-Tek Park in 2002. It is found in Thailand.

The wingspan is 14.5–15 mm. The forewings are golden yellow with creamy-white basal and subbasal lines, with golden yellow between them. There are some sparsely scattered blackish scales and also a dark brown spot surrounded by white scales. The antemedial line is S shaped and creamy white, followed by a golden-yellow area before the postmedian line. The hindwings are yellowish white.

Etymology
The species name refers to the colour of the forewings and is derived from Greek charis (meaning charming, gracious).

References

Moths described in 2002
Torodora